Ramón Ibarra Robles, commonly known as Ramón Ibarra (born 31 August 1958) in Getxo, Vizcaya, País Vasco, Spain, is a Spanish actor known for appearing in the long-running telenovela El secreto de Puente Viejo, as well as Julieta and B.

References 

Spanish male television actors
20th-century Spanish male actors
21st-century Spanish male actors
Spanish male stage actors
Spanish male film actors